Gaulden is a surname of Anglo-Saxon origin. Notable people with the surname include:

Kentrell Gaulden (born 1999), better known as YoungBoy Never Broke Again, American rapper
Rashaan Gaulden (born 1995), American football safety

See also
Mary Gaulden Jagger (1921-2007), American radiation geneticist, professor of radiology, and political activist
Gaulden Manor, a country house in England
Goulden